Rickrolling or a Rickroll is an internet meme involving the unexpected appearance of the music video for the 1987 song "Never Gonna Give You Up", performed by English singer Rick Astley. The aforementioned video has over 1 billion views on YouTube. The meme is a type of bait and switch, usually using a disguised hyperlink that leads to the music video. When victims click on a seemingly unrelated link, the site with the music video loads instead of what was expected, and they have been "Rickrolled". The meme has also extended to using the song's lyrics, or singing it, in unexpected contexts. Rick Astley himself has also been Rickrolled on several occasions.

The meme grew out of a similar bait-and-switch trick called "duck rolling" that was popular on the 4chan website in 2006. The video bait-and-switch trick grew popular on 4chan by 2007 April Fools' Day and spread to other Internet sites later that year. The meme gained mainstream attention in 2008 through several publicized events, particularly when YouTube used it on its 2008 April Fools' Day event.

Rick Astley, who had only returned to performing after a 10-year hiatus, was initially hesitant about using his newfound popularity from the meme to further his career but accepted the fame by Rickrolling the 2008 Macy's Thanksgiving Day Parade with a surprise performance of the song. Since then, Rick Astley has seen his performance career revitalized by the meme's popularity.

History

Origin
"Never Gonna Give You Up" appeared on Astley's 1987 debut album Whenever You Need Somebody. The song, his solo debut single, was a number-one hit on several international charts, including the Billboard Hot 100, Hot Adult Contemporary Tracks, and the UK Singles Chart. The accompanying music video, Astley's first, features him performing the song while dancing.

The use of the song for rickrolling dates to 2006, originating from the 4chan imageboard in an early meme known as "duck rolling". Sometime in 2006, the site moderator, Christopher "m00t" Poole, implemented a word filter replacing the word "egg" with "duck" as a gag. On one thread, where "eggroll" had become "duckroll", an anonymous user posted an edited image of a duck with wheels, calling it a "duckroll". The image caught on across 4chan, becoming the target of a hyperlink with an otherwise interesting title, with a user clicking through having been stated to be "duck rolled".

In March 2007, the first trailer for the highly anticipated Grand Theft Auto IV was released onto the Rockstar Games website. Viewership was so high that it crashed Rockstar's site. Several users helped to post mirrors of the video on different sites, but one user on 4chan, Shawn Cotter, had linked to the "Never Gonna Give You Up" video claiming to be the trailer, tricking numerous readers into the bait-and-switch. This practice quickly replaced duck rolling for other alluring links, all generally pointing to Astley's video, and thus creating the practice of "rickrolling". The bait-and-switch to "Never Gonna Give You Up" greatly expanded on 4chan on April Fools' Day in 2007, and led to the trick expanding to other sites like Fark and Digg later that year, quickly adding the name "rickrolling" based on the prior "duck rolling".

A precursor of "rickrolling" occurred in 2006, when rural Michigan resident Erik Helwig called in to a local radio sports-talk show and, instead of conversing with the DJs, played "Never Gonna Give You Up", leaving the DJs speechless. While this occurred before 4chan's use of the song, Know Your Meme editor-in-chief Don Caldwell said there was no direct confirmation of whether it had inspired the 4chan use of the video.

Growth in 2008

Rickrolling started to appear in more mainstream sources during 2008, with a SurveyUSA April 2008 poll estimating that at least 18 million US adults had been rickrolled.

One of the first public events involved the Church of Scientology, which had been aggressively trying to censor videos critical of the church. The Internet group Anonymous, as part of their Project Chanology to challenge this censoring, protested at the Church's various headquarters across the globe by chanting the song, among other activities. A number of collegiate basketball games in March 2008 had people dressing up as Astley from the video and lip-syncing to the music as a prank before the start of the game. YouTube's 2008 April Fools joke made featured video hyperlinks on the site's home page end up on the music video. In April 2008, the New York Mets baseball team asked fans on the internet what song they should use for their eighth-inning rally song. "Never Gonna Give You Up" received a massive number of votes, driven by websites like 4chan. At the 2008 MTV Europe Music Awards, an online campaign led to Astley being named the "Best Act Ever" despite not being on the original shortlist of nominees, effectively rickrolling the awards.

By November 2008, the "Never Gonna Give You Up" video on YouTube had more than 20 million views and was considered a viral video; however, Astley initially appeared indifferent to the newfound fame. When Astley was asked about the trend of rickrolling during an interview in March 2008, he stated, "it's weird", since he had not performed much lately, but he found the interest funny. However, at the 2008 Macy's Thanksgiving Day Parade, Astley made a surprise appearance on a float of the animated TV show Foster's Home for Imaginary Friends for Cartoon Network to lip-sync the song to the crowd and television audiences, making that performance the largest rickroll to date. According to Astley, Cartoon Network had urged him to perform for the parade along with a large performance payment, and although he had been wary of trying to promote himself using the popularity of the meme, he decided to go for it.

Later usage
In September 2009, Wired magazine published a guide to modern hoaxes which listed rickrolling as one of the better known beginner-level hoaxes, along with the fake e-mail chain letter. The term has been extended to simple hidden use of the song's lyrics. Cover versions of "Never Gonna Give You Up" have also been used as part of rickrolling; in April 2018, the creators of TV's Westworld released a video that purported to be a spoiler guide for the entire second season in advance, but instead featured lead actress Evan Rachel Wood singing the song while accompanied by another main actress, Angela Sarafyan, playing the piano.

In 2011, members of the Oregon, USA legislature slipped snippets of the song's lyrics into speeches they gave on the floor of the legislature. Aides later stitched together a video compilation of these snippets into a full song, released on YouTube.

The most popular upload of the music video on YouTube from 2007 used for rickrolling, titled "RickRoll'D", was removed for terms-of-use violations in February 2010 but the takedown was revoked within a day. It was taken down again on 18 July 2014. It was later unblocked again and gained over 89 million views by 2021. It was once again taken down in July 2021 for “Violating YouTube's Terms of Service” but  the video is currently viewable again. The official Rick Astley channel uploaded another version on 24 October 2009, which surpassed one-billion views in July 2021.

Its meme status led to the song's usage in pop culture. In 2015 on Neon Mixtape Tour - Day 32, in Plants vs. Zombies 2, Dr. Zomboss referenced that song before attacking the player. In 2016, that song was played in The Angry Birds Movie in a scene when Mighty Eagle practices how to fly. It was also referenced in four episodes of the twentieth season of South Park. In Walt Disney Animation Studios' 2018 sequel film Ralph Breaks the Internet, a "sneak peek" of Frozen II suddenly transitions into Ralph singing a cover of "Never Gonna Give You Up", and replicating Astley's dance from the original music video during the post-credits scene. The song also appears in the film Bumblebee, and was featured at the end of its initial teaser trailer.

On 5 January 2018, Paul Fenwick announced that he had started several Rick Astley hotlines, which when called, would play "Never Gonna Give You Up" along with several other artists' adaptations of it. Paul Fenwick advertised it by saying, "You are encouraged to use them for paperwork, loyalty schemes, and general joy." On 25 August 2019 there was a notable large-scale occurrence at Petco Park in San Diego during a Major League Baseball game between the Boston Red Sox and the San Diego Padres—the first game that the Red Sox played at Petco Park in six years. During a mid-inning break, the Padres' scoreboard began to play "Sweet Caroline"—a tradition at Red Sox home games in Fenway Park—but the Red Sox were the opposition in San Diego. As the Neil Diamond song was about to reach the chorus, however, the video-board suddenly switched to "Never Gonna Give You Up", much to the amusement of the crowd.

On 13 October 2019, the Sunday night NFL game between the Pittsburgh Steelers and Los Angeles Chargers at Dignity Health Sports Park featured a case of rickrolling when the PA announcers, after a Chargers touchdown brought the score to 24-10 Pittsburgh, decided to troll the partisan crowd by playing the beginning of the Styx song "Renegade" (which had been played at the Steelers home Heinz Field since 2001) only to transition into "Never Gonna Give You Up". The stunt caught fans and players from both teams by surprise (even being acknowledged by the Steelers official social media accounts), and some Chargers players were not happy about the Steelers anthem being played in their home stadium. The Steelers won the game 24–17.

Rickrolling saw a massive resurgence online in the early 2020s. In online classes on Zoom during the worldwide COVID-19 lockdown, students often rickrolled their classmates and teachers. A 4K remaster of the "Never Gonna Give You Up" music video went viral in early 2021. Nintendo and The Pokémon Company had announced 1 July 2021 as "Bidoof Day" with plans for a major announcement for the Pokémon series, which turned out to be a rickroll using a parody of "Never Gonna Give You Up". Later that month, the meme resulted in the music video for "Never Gonna Give You Up" reaching 1 billion views, becoming the fourth 1980s song to do so.

In the tenth episode of the second season of Ted Lasso, "No Weddings and a Funeral", the main character prepares to give a eulogy but instead breaks out into leading the attendees in singing "Never Gonna Give You Up", effectively rickrolling the attendees and the audience.
Greta Thunberg rickrolled her followers on April Fools' Day 2021 by posting a link to "a climate-related video" which linked to Astley's music video. She followed this on 16 October 2021 at the Climate Live concert in Stockholm by saying, during a speech with important messages on climate action, "We're no strangers to love ... You know the rules and so do I", followed by singing the song and dancing to it, to great applause; Astley tweeted his thanks.

Astley recreated the original video clip in a 2022 advertisement for the American Automobile Association. In the videoclip, a QR code was included to Rickroll the viewers.

Reaction

In an interview in March 2008, Astley said that he found the rickrolling of Scientology to be "hilarious"; he also said that he will not try to capitalise on the rickroll phenomenon with a new recording or remix of his own, but that he would be happy to have other artists remix it. Overall, Astley is not troubled by the phenomenon, stating that he finds it "bizarre and funny" and that his only concern is that his "daughter doesn't get embarrassed about it." A spokesperson for Astley's record label released a comment which showed that Astley's interest with the phenomenon had faded, as they stated, "I'm sorry, but he's done talking about Rickrolling".

In November 2008, Astley was nominated for "Best Act Ever" at the MTV Europe Music Awards after the online nomination form was flooded with votes. The push to make Astley the winner of the award, as well as efforts to encourage MTV to personally invite Astley to the awards ceremony, continued after the announcement. On 10 October, Astley's website confirmed that an invitation to the awards had been received. On 6 November 2008, just hours before the ceremony was due to air, it was reported that MTV Europe did not want to give Astley the award at the ceremony, instead of wanting to present it at a later date. Many fans who voted for Astley felt the awards ceremony failed to acknowledge him as a legitimate artist. Astley stated in an interview that he felt the award was "daft", but noted that he thought that "MTV were thoroughly rickrolled", and went on to thank everyone who voted for him.
In 2009, Astley wrote about 4chan founder moot for Time magazine's annual Time 100 issue, thanking moot for the rickrolling phenomenon.

According to The Register, Astley had directly received only $12 in performance royalties from YouTube. Although by that time the song had been played 39 million times, Astley did not compose the song and received only a performer's share of the sound recording copyright. However, Astley denied those reports in 2016.

Astley himself has been rickrolled a few times; in fact, the first time he was rickrolled actually pre-dated the viral phenomenon. In an interview with Larry King, Astley stated that the first time he fell for the prank was through an email his friend sent him during the early 2000s. On a Reddit post in June 2020, a user, u/theMalleableDuck, claimed to have met Astley backstage when they were 12 years old, but the user posted a link to the song instead of a picture verifying the encounter. Astley later confirmed he had been tricked into clicking the link. The submission became the most upvoted post of 2020 on Reddit.

See also

List of Internet phenomena
List of most-viewed YouTube videos
List of practical joke topics
Sandstorm (instrumental), an instrumental piece by Finnish DJ Darude that has become the subject of a similar internet meme.
goatse.cx, the shock bait and switch precursor to Rickrolling.

References

Further reading

External links

Video on YouTube
An Oral History of Rickrolling

4chan phenomena
Internet memes
Internet memes introduced in 2007
Internet trolling
Pop music
Practical jokes
Rick Astley
Viral videos
2007 YouTube videos
2000s in Internet culture
2010s in Internet culture
2020s in Internet culture
2007 neologisms
2000s neologisms

sv:Rick Astley#Rickrolling